The 2017–18 AWIHL season is the 11th season of the Australian Women's Ice Hockey League (AWIHL). It ran from 28 October 2017 until 18 March 2018. Four teams competed in 24 regular season games followed by 4 playoff games, making up the AWIHL Finals weekend. The Sydney Sirens claimed the premiership title for finishing top of the regular season standings, while the Melbourne Ice claimed the Joan McKowen Memorial Trophy championship title by winning the grand final. Melbourne finished runner-up in the season standings while Sydney lost the grand final. Adelaide Rush came last in the regular season and claimed the wooden spoon.

Teams

In 2017–18 the AWIHL had four teams from four Australian state capital cities competing, stretching across the east coast and southern Australian mainland. Perth Inferno was added as an exhibition team only for the 2017–18 season, as they looked to meet criteria set down by the AWIHL Commission to be granted a full licence for 2018–19.

League Business

The official AWIHL gameday schedule was released at the start of September 2017. The season structure remained unchanged from 2016-17, each team competing in a four game series against each other team, playing two games at home and two games away. Looking to become the first AWIHL expansion team, Perth Inferno, was admitted to the league on a provisional licence to play two exhibition games against the Sydney Sirens. The first of these two exhibition games, at Canterbury Olympic Ice Rink, was to be live streamed by Thought Fox Media Group with commentary by Eric Brookes. Ahead of the season, the AWIHL announced the continuation of their sponsorship agreement with Skaters Network in November 2017. The agreement would continue the company’s status as preferred equipment supplier to the AWIHL and the naming rights holder for the player of the month award. Ice Hockey Australia also announced the establishment and go-live of the league's new website, hosted on the Ice Hockey Australia's website, it contains separate pages for each team, news, history and is linked to the eSportsdesk website that contains all information on games, players, scores and stats. Every AWIHL game of the 2017-18 season would be live streamed on the new website. In December 2017, AWIHL commissioner, Melissa Rulli, announced the league had secured a event assistance grant under the Victorian Government's Significant Sporting Events Program, to host the AWIHL Finals weekend in Melbourne at O'Brien Group Arena.

Regular season

Fixtures and results
Running between 28 October 2017 and 4 March 2018, the AWIHL regular season consisted of 24 games in total, with teams playing 12 games each, 4 games (2 home and 2 away) against each opponent. There additionally was two exhibition games scheduled for Sydney in February 2018 between the Sydney Sirens and prospective expansion side Perth Inferno. The Sirens won both games comfortably against the exhibition Perth team, scoring sixteen goals and conceding five.

October

November

December

January

February

March

Key:

Standings

Player stats
The season's league leader statistics for skaters and goaltenders.

Season awards

Below lists the 2017–18 AWIHL regular season award winners.

Joan McKowen playoffs
The top four teams in the AWIHL regular season qualify for the Joan McKowen Memorial Trophy playoffs. The playoffs is held on a single weekend and uses Australian conventions of being called Finals. The playoff system used by the AWIHL is a four team single game semi-finals and grand final system where the semi-final winners progress to the grand final and the losers playoff for third place. Semi-finals are played on the Saturday and the third place playoff and grand final is played on the Sunday. The prize for being crowned AWIHL Champions for winning the grand final is the Joan McKowen Memorial Trophy.

In 2017–18, the Adelaide Rush, Sydney Sirens, Brisbane Goannas and Melbourne Ice qualified for the finals weekend. The event was held on 17 and 18 March 2018 in host city Melbourne at O’Brien Group Arena. On Saturday, Sydney won the first semi final in a high scoring affair against Adelaide. In the second semi-final, the Melbourne Ice made light work of Brisbane to advance to the grand final. On Sunday, first up, the Goannas won a close contest against the Rush to secure bronze medals for the Queenslanders. In the grand final, Melbourne Ice secured their record equaling sixth championship title and lifted the Joan McKowen Memorial Trophy, after defeating the Sydney Sirens 4–2, with Jessica Pinkerton scoring all four goals for the winners.

Semi-finals

Third place playoff

Final

References

External links 
Australian Women's Hockey League
Ice Hockey Australia

Australian Women's Ice Hockey League seasons
Aust
ice hockey
ice hockey